Alexithymia is a neuropsychological phenomenon expressing  important difficulties in identifying and describing the experienced emotions by oneself or others. It also involves emotional issues in terms of social attachment and interpersonal relations. There is no scientific agreement whether this neuropsychological phenomenon is a personality trait, a medical symptom or eventually (in few researches) a mental disorder.

High levels of alexithymia occur in approximately 10% of the population and can occur with a number of psychiatric conditions as well as any neurodevelopmental disorder. Difficulty with recognizing and talking about their emotions appears at subclinical levels in men who conform to particular cultural notions of masculinity (e.g. awkwardly thinking that sadness is a feminine emotion). This is called normative male alexithymia by some researchers. However, both alexithymia itself and its association with traditionally masculine norms occur in both sexes. Moreover, people suffering from alexithymia attempt at appearing unempathic and exchanging/returning inappropriate emotions.

Classification
Alexithymia is considered to be a personality trait that places affected individuals at risk for other medical and psychiatric disorders while reducing the likelihood that these individuals will respond to conventional treatments for the other conditions. The DSM-V and the ICD-11 neither classify alexithymia as symptom, nor as mental disorder. It is a dimensional personality trait that varies in intensity from person to person. A person's alexithymia score can be measured with questionnaires such as the Toronto Alexithymia Scale (TAS-20), the Perth Alexithymia Questionnaire (PAQ), the Bermond-Vorst Alexithymia Questionnaire (BVAQ), the Levels of Emotional Awareness Scale (LEAS), the Online Alexithymia Questionnaire (OAQ-G2), the Toronto Structured Interview for Alexithymia (TSIA), or the Observer Alexithymia Scale (OAS). It is distinct from the psychiatric personality disorders, such as antisocial personality disorder.

Traditionally, alexithymia has been conceptually defined by four components:
 difficulty identifying feelings (DIF)
 difficulty describing feelings to other people (DDF)
 a stimulus-bound, externally oriented thinking style (EOT)
 constricted imaginal processes (IMP)

However, there is some ongoing disagreement in the field about the definition of alexithymia. When measured in empirical studies, constricted imaginal processes are often found not to statistically cohere with the other components of alexithymia. Such findings have led to debate in the field about whether IMP is indeed a component of alexithymia. For example, in 2017, Preece and colleagues introduced the attention-appraisal model of alexithymia, where they suggested that IMP be removed from the definition and that alexithymia be conceptually composed only of DIF, DDF, and EOT, as each of these three are specific to deficits in emotion processing. In practice, since the constricted imaginal processes items were removed from earlier versions of the TAS-20 in the 1990s, the most used alexithymia assessment tools (and consequently most alexithymia research studies) have only assessed the construct in terms of DIF, DDF, and EOT.

Studies (using measures of alexithymia assessing DIF, DDF, and EOT) have reported that the prevalence rate of high alexithymia is less than 10% of the population. A less common finding suggests that there may be a higher prevalence of alexithymia amongst males than females, which may be accounted for by difficulties some males have with "describing feelings", but not by difficulties in "identifying feelings" in which males and females show similar abilities.

Psychologist R. Michael Bagby and psychiatrist Graeme J. Taylor have argued that the alexithymia construct is inversely related to the concepts of psychological mindedness and emotional intelligence and there is "strong empirical support for alexithymia being a stable personality trait rather than just a consequence of psychological distress".

Signs and symptoms
Typical deficiencies may include problems identifying, processing, describing, and working with one's own feelings, often marked by a lack of understanding of the feelings of others; difficulty distinguishing between feelings and the bodily sensations of emotional arousal; confusion of physical sensations often associated with emotions; few dreams or fantasies due to restricted imagination; and concrete, realistic, logical thinking, often to the exclusion of emotional responses to problems. Those who have alexithymia also report very logical and realistic dreams, such as going to the store or eating a meal. Clinical experience suggests it is the structural features of dreams more than the ability to recall them that best characterizes alexithymia.

Some alexithymic individuals may appear to contradict the above-mentioned characteristics because they can experience chronic dysphoria or manifest outbursts of crying or rage. However, questioning usually reveals that they are quite incapable of describing their feelings or appear confused by questions inquiring about specifics of feelings.

According to Henry Krystal, individuals exhibiting alexithymia think in an operative way and may appear to be superadjusted to reality. In psychotherapy, however, a cognitive disturbance becomes apparent as patients tend to recount trivial, chronologically ordered actions, reactions, and events of daily life with monotonous detail. In general, these individuals can, but not always, seem oriented toward things and even treat themselves as robots. These problems seriously limit their responsiveness to psychoanalytic psychotherapy; psychosomatic illness or substance abuse is frequently exacerbated should these individuals enter psychotherapy.

A common misconception about alexithymia is that affected individuals are totally unable to express emotions verbally and that they may even fail to acknowledge that they experience emotions. Even before coining the term, Sifneos (1967) noted patients often mentioned things like anxiety or depression. The distinguishing factor was their inability to elaborate beyond a few limited adjectives such as "happy" or "unhappy" when describing these feelings. The core issue is that people with alexithymia have poorly differentiated emotions limiting their ability to distinguish and describe them to others. This contributes to the sense of emotional detachment from themselves and difficulty connecting with others, making alexithymia negatively associated with life satisfaction even when depression and other confounding factors are controlled for.

Associated conditions
Alexithymia frequently co-occurs with other disorders. Research indicates that alexithymia overlaps with autism spectrum disorders (ASD). In a 2004 study using the TAS-20, 85% of the adults with ASD fell into the "impaired" category and almost half fell into the "severely impaired" category; in contrast, among the adult control population only 17% were "impaired", none "severely impaired". Fitzgerald & Bellgrove pointed out that, "Like alexithymia, Asperger's syndrome is also characterised by core disturbances in speech and language and social relationships". Hill & Berthoz agreed with Fitzgerald & Bellgrove (2006) and in response stated that "there is some form of overlap between alexithymia and ASDs". They also pointed to studies that revealed impaired theory of mind skill in alexithymia, neuroanatomical evidence pointing to a shared etiology and similar social skills deficits. The exact nature of the overlap is uncertain. Alexithymic traits in AS may be linked to clinical depression or anxiety; the mediating factors are unknown and it is possible that alexithymia predisposes to anxiety. On the other hand, while the total alexithymia score as well as the difficulty in identifying feelings and externally oriented thinking factors are found to be significantly associated with ADHD, and while the total alexithymia score, the difficulty in identifying feelings, and the difficulty in describing feelings factors are also significantly associated with symptoms of hyperactivity and impulsivity, there is no significant relationship between alexithymia and inattentiveness symptom.

There are many more psychiatric disorders that overlap with alexithymia. One study found that 41% of US veterans of the Vietnam War with post-traumatic stress disorder (PTSD) were alexithymic. Another study found higher levels of alexithymia among Holocaust survivors with PTSD compared to those without. Higher levels of alexithymia among mothers with interpersonal violence-related PTSD were found in one study to have proportionally less caregiving sensitivity. This latter study suggested that when treating adult PTSD patients who are parents, alexithymia should be assessed and addressed also with attention to the parent-child relationship and the child's social-emotional development.

Single study prevalence findings for other disorders include 63% in anorexia nervosa, 56% in bulimia, 45% to 50% in major depressive disorder, 34% in panic disorder, 28% in social phobia, and 50% in substance abusers. Alexithymia is also exhibited by a large proportion of individuals with acquired brain injuries such as stroke or traumatic brain injury.

Alexithymia is correlated with certain personality disorders, particularly schizoid, avoidant, dependent and schizotypal, substance use disorders, some anxiety disorders and sexual disorders as well as certain physical illnesses, such as hypertension, inflammatory bowel disease, diabetes and functional dyspepsia. Alexithymia is further linked with disorders such as migraine headaches, lower back pain, irritable bowel syndrome, asthma, nausea, allergies and fibromyalgia.

An inability to modulate emotions is a possibility in explaining why some people with alexithymia are prone to discharge tension arising from unpleasant emotional states through impulsive acts or compulsive behaviors such as binge eating, substance abuse, perverse sexual behavior or anorexia nervosa. The failure to regulate emotions cognitively might result in prolonged elevations of the autonomic nervous system (ANS) and neuroendocrine systems, which can lead to somatic diseases. People with alexithymia also show a limited ability to experience positive emotions leading Krystal and Sifneos (1987) to describe many of these individuals as anhedonic.

Alexisomia is a clinical concept that refers to the difficulty in the awareness and expression of somatic, or bodily, sensations. The concept was first proposed in 1979 by Dr. Yujiro Ikemi when he observed characteristics of both alexithymia and alexisomia in patients with psychosomatic diseases.

Causes
It is unclear what causes alexithymia, though several theories have been proposed.

Early studies showed evidence that there may be an interhemispheric transfer deficit among people with alexithymia; that is, the emotional information from the right hemisphere of the brain is not being properly transferred to the language regions in the left hemisphere, as can be caused by a decreased corpus callosum, often present in psychiatric patients who have suffered severe childhood abuse. A neuropsychological study in 1997 indicated that alexithymia may be due to a disturbance to the right hemisphere of the brain, which is largely responsible for processing emotions. In addition, another neuropsychological model suggests that alexithymia may be related to a dysfunction of the anterior cingulate cortex. These studies have some shortcomings, however, and the empirical evidence about the neural mechanisms behind alexithymia remains inconclusive.

French psychoanalyst Joyce McDougall objected to the strong focus by clinicians on neurophysiological explanations at the expense of psychological ones for the genesis and operation of alexithymia, and introduced the alternative term "disaffectation" to stand for psychogenic alexithymia. For McDougall, the disaffected individual had at some point "experienced overwhelming emotion that threatened to attack their sense of integrity and identity", to which they applied psychological defenses to pulverize and eject all emotional representations from consciousness. A similar line of interpretation has been taken up using the methods of phenomenology. McDougall has also noted that all infants are born unable to identify, organize, and speak about their emotional experiences (the word infans is from the Latin "not speaking"), and are "by reason of their immaturity inevitably alexithymic". Based on this fact McDougall proposed in 1985 that the alexithymic part of an adult personality could be "an extremely arrested and infantile psychic structure". The first language of an infant is nonverbal facial expressions. The parent's emotional state is important for determining how any child might develop. Neglect or indifference to varying changes in a child's facial expressions without proper feedback can promote an invalidation of the facial expressions manifested by the child. The parent's ability to reflect self-awareness to the child is another important factor. If the adult is incapable of recognizing and distinguishing emotional expressions in the child, it can influence the child's capacity to understand emotional expressions.

Molecular genetic research into alexithymia remains minimal, but promising candidates have been identified from studies examining connections between certain genes and alexithymia among those with psychiatric conditions as well as the general population. A study recruiting a test population of Japanese males found higher scores on the Toronto Alexithymia Scale among those with the 5-HTTLPR homozygous long (L) allele. The 5-HTTLPR region on the serotonin transporter gene influences the transcription of the serotonin transporter that removes serotonin from the synaptic cleft, and is well studied for its association with numerous psychiatric disorders. Another study examining the 5-HT1A receptor, a receptor that binds serotonin, found higher levels of alexithymia among those with the G allele of the Rs6295 polymorphism within the HTR1A gene. Also, a study examining alexithymia in subjects with obsessive–compulsive disorder found higher alexithymia levels associated with the Val/Val allele of the Rs4680 polymorphism in the gene that encodes Catechol-O-methyltransferase (COMT), an enzyme which degrades catecholamine neurotransmitters such as dopamine. These links are tentative, and further research will be needed to clarify how these genes relate to the neurological anomalies found in the brains of people with alexithymia.

Although there is evidence for the role of environmental and neurological factors, the role and influence of genetic factors for developing alexithymia is still unclear. A single large scale Danish study suggested that genetic factors contributed noticeably to the development of alexithymia. However, some scholars find twin studies and the entire field of behavior genetics to be controversial. Those scholars raise concerns about the "equal environments assumption". Traumatic brain injury is also implicated in the development of alexithymia, and those with traumatic brain injury are six times more likely to exhibit alexithymia.

In relationships
Alexithymia can create interpersonal problems because these individuals tend to avoid emotionally close relationships, or if they do form relationships with others they usually position themselves as either dependent, dominant, or impersonal, "such that the relationship remains superficial". Inadequate "differentiation" between self and others by alexithymic individuals has also been observed. Their difficulty in processing interpersonal connections often develops where the person lacks a romantic partner.

In a study, a large group of alexithymic individuals completed the 64-item Inventory of Interpersonal Problems (IIP-64) which found that "two interpersonal problems are significantly and stably related to alexithymia: cold/distant and non-assertive social functioning. All other IIP-64 subscales were not significantly related to alexithymia."

Chaotic interpersonal relations have also been observed by Sifneos. Due to the inherent difficulties identifying and describing emotional states in self and others, alexithymia also negatively affects relationship satisfaction between couples.

In a 2008 study alexithymia was found to be correlated with impaired understanding and demonstration of relational affection, and that this impairment contributes to poorer mental health, poorer relational well-being, and lowered relationship quality. Individuals high on the alexithymia spectrum also report less distress at seeing others in pain and behave less altruistically toward others.

Some individuals working for organizations in which control of emotions is the norm might show alexithymic-like behavior but not be alexithymic. However, over time the lack of self-expressions can become routine and they may find it harder to identify with others.

Treatment

Generally speaking, approaches to treating alexithymia are still in their infancy, with not many proven treatment options available.

In 2002, Kennedy and Franklin found that a skills-based intervention is an effective method for treating alexithymia. Kennedy and Franklin's treatment plan involved giving the participants a series of questionnaires, psychodynamic therapies, cognitive-behavioral and skills-based therapies, and experiential therapies. After treatment, they found that participants were generally less ambivalent about expressing their emotion feelings and more attentive to their emotional states.

In 2017, based on their attention-appraisal model of alexithymia, Preece and colleagues recommended that alexithymia treatment should target trying to improve the developmental level of people's emotion schemas and reduce people's use of experiential avoidance of emotions as an emotion regulation strategy (i.e., the mechanisms hypothesized to underlie alexithymia difficulties in the attention-appraisal model of alexithymia).

In 2018, Löf, Clinton, Kaldo, and Rydén found that mentalisation-based treatment is also an effective method for treating alexithymia. Mentalisation is the ability to understand the mental state of oneself or others that underlies overt behavior, and mentalisation-based treatment helps patients separate their own thoughts and feelings from those around them. This treatment is relational, and it focuses on gaining a better understanding and use of mentalising skills. The researchers found that all of the patients' symptoms including alexithymia significantly improved, and the treatment promoted affect tolerance and the ability to think flexibly while expressing intense affect rather than impulsive behavior.

A significant issue impacting alexithymia treatment is that alexithymia has comorbidity with other disorders. Mendelson's 1982 study showed that alexithymia frequently presented in people with undiagnosed chronic pain. Participants in Kennedy and Franklin's study all had anxiety disorders in conjunction with alexithymia, while those in Löf et al. were diagnosed with both alexithymia and borderline personality disorder. All these comorbidity issues complicate treatment because it is difficult to examine people who exclusively have alexithymia.

Etymology
The term alexithymia was coined by psychotherapists John Case Nemiah and Peter Sifneos in 1973. The word comes from Greek:  ('not', privative prefix, alpha privative) +  ('words') +  ('disposition', 'feeling', or 'rage') (cf. dyslexia), literally meaning "no words for emotions".

Nonmedical terms describing similar conditions include emotionless and impassive. People with the condition are called alexithymics or alexithymiacs.

See also

 Antisocial personality disorder
 Amplification (psychology)
 Asperger syndrome
 Body-centred countertransference
 Borderline personality disorder
 Disaffectation
 Psychological mindedness
 Prosopagnosia
 Somatization disorder
 Somatosensory amplification

Notes

References

External links 

 

Agnosia
Cognition
Neuropsychology
Personality traits
Symptoms and signs of mental disorders
1970s neologisms